The Senior Naval Officer, Persian Gulf, was a Royal Navy command appointment who was responsible for administering the Persian Gulf Station military formation including its establishments and naval forces known as the Persian Gulf Squadron later called the Persian Gulf Division. Initially located at Basidu, Qishm Island, in Persia (c. 1823–1850–1935), then Henjam Island in Persia (1911–1935), and finally Ras Al-Jufair, Bahrain (1935–1972). 
 
The Persian Gulf Station encompassed the Persian Gulf and Straits of Hormuz.

History
British naval presence in the Persian Gulf began in the early nineteenth century with temporary naval forces assembled for specific operations until the establishment of a more constant naval force presence called the Persian Gulf Squadron  later the Persian Gulf Division. The Senior Naval Office Persian Gulf gradually became an important position throughout the twentieth century by supporting Britain's strategic interests in the region, he reported to the Commander-in-Chief, East Indies Station. The Persian Gulf was one of the areas of naval operations during First World War in which it assumed a level of importance during the Mesopotamian campaign, its operations consisted of  patrolling, keeping the peace and ensuring the continued supply of oil from the region. In May 1942  it then became part of the Eastern Fleet command until May 1944 when it became part of the East Indies Fleet command until July 1945 when it was abolished. The station was re-established in April 1949 reporting to the C-in-C, East Indies Station until 1958. In 1959 the station was merged with the Red Sea Station under the new appointment of Commodore, Arabian Seas and Persian Gulf. In 1962 the station was re-established under the Flag Officer, Middle East, until it was abolished in 1972.

In 2003 the Royal Navy reestablished a post in the Persian Gulf, with a new title, the UK Maritime Component Command. On 1 November 2015, it was announced that HMS Jufair would be re-established as a permanent Royal Navy base. On 5 April 2018, the UK Naval Support Facility was officially opened.

Headquarters
The British established a Persian Gulf Squadron in the mid-nineteenth century to support the Political Resident Persian Gulf (PRPG), who was responsible for all of Britains relationships in the region. The SNOPG was originally headquartered at Basidu on-board his ship from 1823 onward. A permanent depot and headquarters was first established at Basidu, Qishm Island, in Persia, around 1850. In 1911 his headquarters moved to Henjam Island in the Straits of Hormuz until 12 April 1935. On 13 April 1935 a naval base and shore establishment called  was established at Ras Al-Jufair, Bahrain, which served as headquarters for the SNO Persian Gulf until 1972.

SNOPG, Ships
Followed by HMS Triad from 1909 to 21 April 1933  It was replaced by  21 April 1933 to 1946.

Four Loch-class frigates were stationed in the Persian Gulf circa 1957: HMS Loch Fada, HMS Loch Fyne, HMS Loch Killisport and HMS Loch Ruthven.

Senior Naval Officers, Persian Gulf 
Incomplete list of post holders included:

Naval formations and units that served in this command
Included:

References

Sources
Bankoff, Greg; Christensen, Joseph (2016). Natural Hazards and Peoples in the Indian Ocean World: Bordering on Danger. Berlin, Germany: Springer. .
Harley, Simon; Lovell, Tony. (2017) "Persian Gulf – The Dreadnought Project". www.dreadnoughtproject.org. Harley and Lovell.
Kindell, Don. (2012) "North Atlantic Command, Force H, South Atlantic Command, America & West Indies Command, Eastern Fleet, January 1942". www.naval-history.net. Gordon Smith.
Macris, Jeffrey R. (2010). The Politics and Security of the Gulf: Anglo-American Hegemony and the Shaping of a Region. Cambridge, England: Routledge. .
Naval Review. (1959)  "OP SHIPS" Volume 47: 105. 
Onley, James. "Britain's Native Agents in Arabia and Persia in the Nineteenth Century1" (PDF). socialsciences.exeter.ac.uk. University of Exeter, England.
 Pollock, Arthur William Alsager (1861). "List of the Indian Navy in Commission". The United Service Magazine. London. H. Colburn.
Residency, Persian Gulf Political; Agency, Muscat Political; (Kuwait), British Political Agency; Agency, Qatar Political; Agency, Trucial States Political; Agency, Bahrain Political; Residency, Bushire Political (1990). Political Diaries of the Persian Gulf: 1935–35. London, England: Archive Editions. .
The Navy List. (1915) "Flag Officers in Commission". London England: HM Stationery Office.
The Navy List. (1944) "Flag Officers in Commission". London, England: H. M. Stationery Office.

External links 

P
Military units and formations established in 1909
Military units and formations disestablished in 1972